Evergeen Valley High School is a comprehensive, 4-year high school located in the Evergreen area of San Jose, California, and is part of the East Side Union High School District.  It was founded in 2002. The school held its first graduation of seniors on June 7, 2005.  From 2007 to 2015, U.S. News & World Report recognized the school with a silver award in its Best High Schools 2008-2015 list. In 2013, Evergreen Valley received a clear six year accreditation from the Western Association of Schools and Colleges.

History
Evergreen Valley High School opened in 2002 on the "Small School" concept, with an emphasis on technology and the idea that every student would have a laptop to take home for doing homework. The school opened initially with only two grade levels: freshmen and sophomores. It existed as a single high school, with four mostly independent schools within it: Science & Technology, Global Economy, Human Performance, and Humanities. The first year EVHS was open, Science & Technology and Human Performance students received IBM Notebooks, while Global Economy and Humanities Students received Apple iBooks. In Fall 2002, the campus was still unfinished, so classes took place in portables on two nearby campuses: Silver Creek High School and Mount Pleasant High School. S&T and HU were situated at Silver Creek, while HP and GE were situated in Mt. Pleasant. The EVHS campus officially was open for attendance in January 2003. Administration tended to be unhelpful in teachers' and students' requests for aid, although they themselves were also swamped with the task of managing a brand new school. 
In January 2004, petitions circulated after enrollment at Evergreen Valley quickly approached its limit of 1,800: one calling for shrunken boundaries and another for expansion. On March 11, 2004, district trustees voted to construct a new building on campus to ease overcrowding. In 2006, construction began for the building.

In July 2004, the San Jose Mercury News profiled the use of the Xanga blog site by EVHS students.

Principals existed for all of the schools, and were supervised by a primary principal. However, due to change in district leadership and issues with funding and philosophy, in February 2004, the small school system was done away with, and the high school adopted a traditional format, which it has kept until the present.

The Class of 2005, the first class of students to have attended the school since its opening year in 2002, graduated on June 7, 2005.

Several troubling instances occurred on one week in March 2009; overnight between March 14 and 15, a 20-foot swastika was etched on a lawn that had also been salted earlier, and several trees were cut down. Then on March 17, an envelope was mailed to school containing a suspicious white powder and a letter expressing dissatisfaction over the school's dress code policy regarding hats. This led to the administrative building being evacuated, but an investigation revealed that the substance was merely baby powder. Following rumors spread over the Internet that a shooting would occur that day, a majority of the student body did not show up to class on March 20. The Federal Bureau of Investigation and San Jose Police Department began a probe into these incidents immediately.

Academics

Biotech Academy
Geared towards relieving the overcrowding at Evergreen Valley High School, the Biotech Academy existed from 2004–06 in portables at the campus of Evergreen Valley College in August 2004, offering a "small school" environment (similar to EVHS's original blueprint) as well as a focus on biotechnology and the opportunity to take more advanced classes, including college classes. Laptops and smaller classes were also promised, and delivered after half a year. Students attending the Biotech Academy were still eligible to participate in extracurricular clubs, leadership programs, sports, and activities at Evergreen Valley High School. However, the academy was closed in 2006 due to budget cuts and declining interest. As soon as the Biotech Academy was closed, construction began on a new building in EVHS to handle the overcrowding due to extremely large incoming classes.

Demographics
In the 2005–06 school year, out of 2,411 students, 57.6% of all students were of Asian descent (12% of which is Filipino), 23.2% Hispanic, 14.3% White, 4.6% African American, and 0.3% American Indian. As of 2004-2005, the graduation rate was 68.9%. According to the San Francisco Chronicle, the son of actor Don Duong once attended EVHS.

In the 2008-09 school year, out of 2,601 students, 60.5% of all students were of Asian descent (11% of which is Filipino), 24% Hispanic, 10.2% White, 4% African American, 1% Pacific Islander, and 0.3% American Indian. 

In the 2013-14 school year, 2,715 students were registered with the school, 61% of all students were of Asian descent, 20% were Hispanic, 6% were Caucasian/White, 2% were African American/Black, and 1% were reported as being Hawaiian Native/Pacific Islander. 18% of all students were eligible for free or reduced lunch fees and 53% were considered English Language Learners (ELL).

In the 2014-15 school year, 2,693 students were registered with the school, 68% of all students were of Asian descent, 20% were Hispanic, 7% were Caucasian/White, 2% were African American/Black, and 0.5% were reported as being Hawaiian Native/Pacific Islander. 16% of all students were eligible for free or reduced lunch fees.

Extracurricular activities
The school's orchestra and wind ensemble performed in Carnegie Hall in New York City.

Speech and Debate
Evergreen Valley High School has a fairly successful Speech and Debate team, which attends tournaments in the California Coast Forensics League and on the national circuit. With several members who have qualified, attended and won the annual Tournament of Champions, EV's Speech and Debate team has been ranked one of the highest in the nation.

Athletics
Evergreen Valley has had a strong athletic tradition since the opening of the school. Sports that are offered are Cross country, football, tennis, volleyball, water polo, basketball, soccer, wrestling, badminton, baseball, softball, swimming, cheerleading, track and field, and golf (as of the 2009–10 school year). The San Francisco Chronicle profiled an EVHS swimmer in April 2005. For the 2006–07 school year, the Blossom Valley Athletic League ranked EVHS fifth out of 22 in the league's "Best of the Best" standings.

Accomplishments

Evergreen's boys' track and field team completed undefeated seasons of 7-0 [JV] (2005-2006) & 7-0 (2012–13)
Evergreen's JV wrestling team completed an undefeated season of 7-0 (2006-2007)
Evergreen's boys' and girls' swimming team completed an undefeated season of 7-0 (2006-2007)
Evergreen's badminton team completed an undefeated season of 16-0 (2013-2014) and (2016-2017). They are currently on a 6-year win streak as of 2022 in the Blossom Valley Athletic League.
Evergreen’s varsity football team completed an undefeated season of 7-0 and the B.V.A.L Title (2004-2005)
Evergreen's JV football team completed an undefeated season of 7-0 (2014–15)
Evergreen's boys' golf team completed consecutive undefeated seasons of the 2014 & 2015 school years. Recording 16-0 (2014)  & 15-0 (2015) 
Justin Suh (golf) finished 2nd in the state in 10th grade, 1st in 11th grade, and 2nd in 12th grade where he shot 2 under par at the pro Poppy Hills course in Pebble Beach.
Mason Jiang and Eric Jiang (badminton) won the Central Coast Section for Boys Doubles on Saturday, May 31 of 2013. They beat the #1 overall seed of the tournament in a three set thriller 26-24,19-21,21-19.

Notable alumni
Matt Stonie, #3 ranked competitive eater in Major League Eating.
Sanjoy, EDM artist

References

External links

Official site

East Side Union High School District
Educational institutions established in 2002
High schools in San Jose, California
Public high schools in California
2002 establishments in California